Fort Valley may refer to:
 Fort Valley, Arizona, United States
 Fort Valley, Georgia, United States
 Fort Valley, Virginia, United States